Pavla Havlíková (born 20 April 1983) is a Czech professional racing cyclist.

Career highlights

 2004: 3rd in National Championship, Road, Elite, Czech Republic (F) (CZE)
 2006: 2nd in National Championship, Road, Elite, Czech Republic (F), Bratislava (CZE)
 2007: 3rd in National Championship, Road, Elite, Czech Republic (F), Brno (CZE)
 2007: 1st in Plzeň, Cyclo-cross (F) (CZE)
 2007: 1st in Gieten, Cyclo-cross (F) (NED)
 2007: 1st in Nommay, Cyclo-cross (F) (FRA)
 2008: 3rd in Surhuisterveen Centrumcross (F) (NED)
 2009/2010: 10th in UCI Cyclo-cross World Cup

External links

1983 births
Living people
Czech female cyclists
Cyclo-cross cyclists
Place of birth missing (living people)